Shashi Kumar (born 2 December 1965) is an actor and politician from Karnataka. He works predominantly in Kannada films.

Acting career
Shashi Kumar's first released film was Chiranjeevi Sudhakara starring Raghavendra Rajkumar. In 1989 he became popular with Yuddha Kaanda starring V. Ravichandran and Poonam Dhillon and C.B.I Shankar with Shankar Nag. In 1990 two successful films Rani Maharani and Baare Nanna Muddina Rani established him as a top hero of Kannada cinema. Shashi Kumar and Malashri, who acted together in several hit films together are considered one among the all-time popular pairs of Kannada cinema. He was also paired with actresses Sudha Rani, Tara, Soundarya and Sithara and Shruthi.

He was in a car accident near the Bangalore Turf Club in 1998. The surgeries altered his looks and offers for lead roles from big banners stopped coming his way. For a few years, he starred in supporting roles in multi-starrers like Yajamana, Habba, Kanasugara, Snehaloka and Yaarige Saluthe Sambala. He later decided to take the plunge into politics.

Political career
He was a member of the 13th Lok Sabha representing Chitradurga and contesting on a Janata Dal (United) ticket. He joined the Indian National Congress in 2006. He has successfully contested and won the Member of Parliament elections for Chitradurga constituency.

Selected filmography

References

External links 
 
 Shashi Kumar bioprofile

21st-century Indian male actors
Politicians from Bangalore
Male actors in Kannada cinema
Indian male film actors
Living people
1965 births
India MPs 1999–2004
Lok Sabha members from Karnataka
Indian actor-politicians
Janata Dal (United) politicians
20th-century Indian male actors
Male actors from Bangalore
Janata Dal (Secular) politicians
Indian National Congress politicians